I Love You is a 1992 Indian Hindi-language romantic drama film directed by Vara Prasad. The film stars Prashanth and Sabah. The supporting cast includes Amrish Puri, Ashok Saraf and Charan Raj. It is a remake of the Tamil film Vaigasi Poranthachu which also starred Prashanth.

Plot

A poor boy falls in love with a rich girl but the girl's evil father opposes the marriage as the boy is from poor family and also shares a secret about his father.

Cast
Prashanth as Kishan
Sabah as Radha
Tanuja
Beena Banerjee
Reema Lagoo
Laxmikant Berde
Asrani
Amrish Puri
Ashok Saraf
Charan Raj

Songs

References

External links
http://www.bollywoodhungama.com/movies/cast/5691/index.html
http://ibosnetwork.com/asp/filmbodetails.asp?id=I+Love+You -

1992 films
1990s Hindi-language films
1992 romantic drama films
Indian romantic drama films
Hindi remakes of Tamil films
Films directed by T. L. V. Prasad
Films scored by Raamlaxman